Kashee's Beauty Salon is a well-known beauty salon in Pakistan and run by a brother-sister duo. It is considered the ideal salon for bridal makeup in Karachi.

History 
Founded in 2008, Kashee's Beauty Salon is owned by Kashif Aslam, a makeup expert, bridal wear designer and entrepreneur, along with his younger sister Anum Aslam, also a makeup artist. It started as a small beauty salon but expanded within a few years.

In February 2022, Kashee’s Beauty Salon opened a new branch in Lahore. 

In August 2022, it held its first ever solo show ‘Bridal Festive 2022’ in Karachi. The showcase divided into four parts: Mayoon, Mehndi, Baraat and Valima. Many celebrities walked on ramp, including Shagufta Ejaz, Shaista Lodhi, Nadia Hussain, Reema Khan, Neelam Muneer, Saba Faisal, Rabeeca Khan, and Sarwat Gillani.

Services 
Kashee's Beauty Salon expanded its service:
 Men Salon
 Film and Photography Studio
 Beauty Parlor for Women
 Bridal Boutique
 Jewelry Line
 Cosmetic Line
 Hair Extension Department

Controversies

Sehar Hayat accused of being bullied 
Sehar Hayat, a Pakistani TikToker, accused the Kashee's Beauty Salon for bullying her. According to the influencer, the salon staff bullied her and were extremely unprofessional. Anum Aslam came forward to giver her version and showed a CCTV footage where Sehar Hayat was seen eating, dancing and having a great time. Anum Aslam accused Sehar Hayat of taking money and defaming the salon.

Allegations for being racist 
Kashee's Beauty Salon posted a video on their Instagram account showing a dark-skinned woman's extremely racist transformation. According to Live Tinted Instagram post, the transformation concluded with the complete erasure of her pigmented skin with the addition of long, blonde hair and light-colored eye contacts.

Awards and accolades 
 Indus Bridal Show - Best Makeup Artist Award
 Feminine Hair & Makeup Institute - Best Artist Award
 Medal of Brand Scientist Award in 2011
 Best Brands of the Year Award 2011 -2012
 Jinnah Prestige Award
 An Award of Youth & Women Entrepreneurship 2013
 An Award of Mega 100 Bridal Contest 2013
 Certificate of Appreciation by Some Senate in 2014
 Kashmir Hum Social Media Awards 2020 - Most Popular Makeup Artist
 Pakistan Intellectual Property Excellence Award 2020
 IPPA Rising Star of the Year 2021

TV/media appearances

 Kashee Latest Interview | Kashees Bridal Festival 2022 | Kashif Aslam Interview on Bridal Show - August 2022
 The Perfect Bridal Eye Makeup Tutorial - Kashif Aslam - August 2021
 Makeup Artist Kashee tells about his interests regarding makeup and bridal dresses - March 2018

References 

 Pakistan